Nicholas Owen, S.J., (c. 1562 – 1/2 March 1606) was an English Jesuit lay brother who was the principal builder of priest holes during the reigns of Queen Elizabeth I and James I of England. Owen built many priest holes in the buildings of English Catholics from 1588 until his final arrest in 1606, when he was tortured to death by prison authorities in the Tower of London. Owen is honoured as a martyr by the Catholic Church and was canonized by Pope Paul VI in 1970.

Life
Nicholas Owen was born around 1562 in Oxford, England, into a devoutly Catholic family and grew up during the Penal Laws. His father, Walter Owen, was a carpenter and Nicholas was apprenticed as a joiner in February 1577, acquiring the skills that he would use to build hiding places. Two of his older brothers became priests.

Owen served as a servant of Edmund Campion, who was arrested by priest hunters in 1581, and was himself arrested for protesting Campion's innocence. Upon his release, he entered the service of Henry Garnet, a Jesuit, around 1588. For the next 18 years, Owen built hiding places for Catholic priests in the homes of Catholic families. He frequently traveled from one house to another under the name of "Little John" and accepted only the necessities of life as payment before he started off for a new project. He also used the aliases "Little Michael", "Andrewes" and "Draper". During the daytime, he would work as a travelling carpenter to deflect suspicion.

Owen was of very short stature, and suffered from a hernia, as well as a crippled leg from a horse falling on him. Nevertheless, his work often involved breaking through thick stonework, and to minimise the likelihood of betrayal, he often worked at night and always alone. Sometimes, he built an easily discovered outer hiding place, which concealed an inner hiding place. The location of the secret room was known to only himself and the owner of the house. Examples of his work survive at Sawston Hall in Cambridgeshire, Oxburgh Hall in Norfolk, Huddington Court in Worcestershire, and Coughton Court in Warwickshire. Harvington Hall in Worcestershire has seven "priest holes". Due to the ingenuity of his craftsmanship, some may still be undiscovered.

For many years, Owen worked in the service of the Jesuit priest Henry Garnet and was admitted into the Society of Jesus as a lay brother. He was arrested in 1594 and tortured at the Poultry Compter but revealed nothing. He was released after a wealthy Catholic family paid a fine on his behalf, the jailers believing that he was merely the insignificant friend of some priests. He resumed his work and is believed to have masterminded the famous escape of John Gerard from the Tower of London in 1597.

In early 1606, Owen was arrested a final time at Hindlip Hall in Worcestershire, giving himself up voluntarily in the hope of distracting attention from his master Garnet, who was hiding nearby with another priest. Realising just whom they had caught, and his value, Secretary of State Robert Cecil exulted: "It is incredible, how great was the joy caused by his arrest... knowing the great skill of Owen in constructing hiding places, and the innumerable quantity of dark holes which he had schemed for hiding priests all through England".

Death
After being committed to the Marshalsea, a prison on the southern bank of the Thames, Owen was then removed to the Tower of London. He was submitted to torture on the Topcliffe rack, dangling from a wall with both wrists held fast in iron gauntlets and his body hanging. As his hernia allowed his intestines to bulge out during this procedure, the rackmaster strapped a circular plate of iron to his stomach. When he remained stubborn, it is believed that he was transferred to the rack, where the greater power of the windlass forced out his hernia, which was then slashed by the plate, resulting in his death. Owen revealed nothing to his inquisitors, and died in the night between 1 and 2 March 1606. Gerard wrote of him:

Veneration
Owen was canonized as one of the Forty Martyrs of England and Wales by Pope Paul VI on 25 October 1970. Their joint feast day was initially celebrated on the anniversary of the canonization. That feast has been moved in England to 4 May. His individual feast day is on 22 March. Catholic stage magicians who practice Gospel Magic consider St. Nicholas Owen the patron saint of illusionists and escapologists, due to his facility at using trompe-l'œil when creating his hideouts.

There are Roman Catholic churches dedicated to Saint Nicholas Owen in Little Thornton, Lancashire and Burton Latimer, Northamptonshire.

The Roman Catholic school academy company that serves the Kidderminster, Hagley and Stourbridge areas near to Harvington Hall is named in his honour.

Portrayals in fiction 
 Owen is portrayed, as a minor character, in Robert Hugh Benson's novel Come Rack! Come Rope! (1912), where he is named "Hugh Owen".  One of his priest holes plays a key role in the Catherine Aird mystery novel A Most Contagious Game (1967).
 A priest hole attributed to him is also part of Peter Carey's novel Parrot and Olivier in America (2010).
 Owen and his work play a key role in The House of a Hundred Whispers by Graham Masterton. Published in 2020 by Head of Zeus Ltd.
 Owen is also a minor character in Leonard Tourney's novel Catesby's Ghost: A Mystery of Shakespeare (2022).

See also
 Priest hole
 Priest hunter
 Richard Holtby

References

Jesuit saints
Canonizations by Pope Paul VI
1550s births
1606 deaths
People from Oxford
Jesuit martyrs
16th-century English Jesuits
17th-century English Jesuits
Canonized Roman Catholic religious brothers
English Roman Catholic saints
Forty Martyrs of England and Wales
People executed by Stuart England
English torture victims
17th-century Christian saints
17th-century Roman Catholic martyrs
People executed by torture
Executed people from Oxfordshire
Inmates of the Marshalsea
Prisoners in the Tower of London